Abhoynagar is Ward No. 7 in the North Municipal Zone of Agartala, Tripura, India.

References 

Geography of Tripura